Dr. Thomas Francis Reason (4 July 1890 – 15 February 1935) was a Welsh cricketer.  Reason was a right-handed batsman who bowled right-arm medium pace.  He was born in Cadoxton, Glamorgan.

Reason made his debut for Glamorgan in the 1914 Minor Counties Championship against Monmouthshire. He played one further match for the county on 1914, before the season was cut short due to the start of the First World War.  Following the completion of his medical training at Guy's Hospital and the resumption of county cricket following the war, Reason once again played for Glamorgan.  In the 1920 Minor Counties Championship he represented the county in 6 matches, with his final Minor Counties appearance for the county coming against Devon.

Reason made his only first-class appearance for the county in 1923 against Somerset.

Reason died at Skewen, Glamorgan on 15 February 1935.

References

External links
Tom Reason at Cricinfo
Tom Reason at CricketArchive

1890 births
1935 deaths
20th-century Welsh medical doctors
Cricketers from Neath Port Talbot
Glamorgan cricketers
Welsh cricketers